Malawi is divided into 28 districts within three regions:

 
Malawi
Malawi